The grey-breasted laughingthrush or Kerala laughingthrush has been split into the following species:

 Palani laughingthrush, Montecincla fairbanki
 Ashambu laughingthrush, Montecincla meridionalis

Birds by common name